Debre Markos is a city, separate woreda, and administrative seat of the East Gojjam Zone in Amhara Region, Ethiopia.

Etymology
Originally named Manqwarar (lit: Cold Place), the town was founded in 1853 by dejazmach Tedla Gwalu, the then ruler of Gojjam. In the 1880s, his successor Negus Tekle Haymanot built the Church of Markos, dedicated to Saint Markos, and named the town after it..

History

19th century 
In 1869 Debre Markos (then Manqwarar) became the seat of the provincial ruler, Ras Adal, who later assumed the name Tekle Haymanot and title Negus of Gojjam.  during his reign and as a result, Pankhurst notes, the population of Debre Markos "fluctuated greatly with the presence of absence of the army" of the Negus. He states that when the Nigus resided in the town, it had between 20,000 and 40,000 inhabitants; in his absence, between 5,000 and 6,000. The explorer Pellegrino Matteucci (b. 1850) arrived at what was at that time named Monkorer on 3 June 1879, explored the neighboring area, then departed 20 June for Adwa and Massawa.

20th century 
In March 1900 an expedition led by Percy Powell-Cotton visited Debre Markos and noted that ‘‘the town looked more like a town than Menelik's capital.

The palace of Nigus Tekle Haimanot was remodeled in 1926 by his son Ras Hailu Tekle Haymanot, in the style of European buildings after his tour of Europe in the party of Ras Tefari. In 1935, the town had postal, telegraph, and telephone service.

The Italians arrived in Debre Markos 20 May 1936. Through an interpreter, Achille Starace, who had arrived by plane, told the surprised local inhabitants that he had come to free them from their oppressors to their thorough bemusement. Debre Markos was later isolated and practically besieged by a revolt in 1938. General Ugo Cavallero, with sixty thousand men and supported by airplanes and tanks, had crushed the revolt by the end of May. A major Italian fortification was located in the city during the existence of Italian East Africa, and captured by the British Gideon Force and Ethiopian Arbegnoch (or Resistance Fighters) 3 April 1941 during the East African Campaign.

In 1957, Nigus Tekle Haimanot School in Debre Markos was one of 9 provincial secondary schools in Ethiopia. The next year, the town was one of 27 places in Ethiopia ranked as a First Class Township. In 1960 a branch of the Ethiopian Electric Light and Power Authority had started operation in Debre Markos.

1968 rebellion  
In 1968 locals in Debre Markos and surrounding districts rebelled against the regional administration after series of accumulated burdens on civilians. The final straw was an attempt to introduce a new agricultural income tax. The population resisted the tax assessors, sent the customary petitions to the emperor to reverse the order and, when no response was forthcoming, rose in rebellion. The rebellion was eventually put down by the national army. The locals however won their cause; the tax order was scrapped.

21st century  
In the national elections of 15 May 2005 the constituency of Debre Markos had  44 polling stations and 38,606 registered voters of whom 84% cast their votes. Coalition for Unity and Democracy dominated with 19,620 votes represented by candidate Ato Dereje Atinafu Dagachew. Far behind was the unpopular ruling EPRDF regime with 7,626 votes represented by candidate Ato Webishet Lengerih Mebirate. The United Ethiopian Democratic Forces party received 449 votes and two independent candidates 362 and 285 votes. The remaining 4,201 votes are not explained. After the national elections there were student demonstrations in Debre Markos and other towns in early June 2005. Human Rights Watch obtained reports of mass arrests of students by police.

Geography  
Debre Markos is located 300 km north-west of Addis Ababa along the Addis Ababa-Gondar road at an elevation of over 2400 meters.

Climate 
Debre Markos has a temperate and warm climate typical of the elevated portions of Ethiopia. The climate is classified subtropical highland (Köppen: Cwb), despite the proximity to the Equator. The minimum and maximum temperatures average between 14 and 20 °C. The mean annual air temperature is 17.3 °C. March and April are the warmest months with average temperature of 19.8.1 °C. July and August are the coldest months with average temperatures of 15.7 °C. The average annual temperature is 17.5 °C.

The average rain fall is considerably irregular going from 15 mm in January to 433 mm in July, being therefore still the main differentiator of the seasons of the year.

Demographics
Based on the 2007 national census conducted by the Central Statistical Agency of Ethiopia (CSA), Debre Markos had a population of 62,497, of whom 29,921 were men and 32,576 women. The majority of residents, 97.03%, practiced Ethiopian Orthodox Christianity, while 1.7% and 1.1% of the population were Muslim and Protestants, respectively.

The population reached about 60,600 in 2001, making Debre Markos the 13th largest town in Ethiopia.

The 1994 national census reported a total population for Debre Markos of 49,297 in 9,617 households, of whom 22,745 were men and 26,552 were women. The largest ethnic group of the town was reported to be the Amhara (97.12%) while the rest including Tigrayan (1.29%), Oromo (0.67%) and others comprising less than 1% of the population. The majority of the inhabitants practiced Ethiopian Orthodox Christianity, with 97.25% reporting that as their religion, while 1.88% were Muslim, and 0.81% were Protestant.

A population count in Debre Markos reached 44,410 in 1987, more than doubling in twenty years. The census counted 31,842 inhabitants in 1975, which was 10,000 more than at a previous census in 1967 which counted 21,536 residents.

Culture  
The town's principal church is dedicated to Markos.

Economy 
Debre Markos is located close to a strategic mountain, Mount Chokea, which is one of the major sources for the water tower of Africa. The mountain is the source of over 40 rivers and is located around 60 km north of Debre Markos and at 4100 meters above sea level. It is also a home of diverse wildlife, birds, clean air which creates stimulating memories and relives stress.

Debre Markos is also known for being a producer of prolific writers, monuments, poetries, and spirituals. It is close to historical traditional schools, including Dima Giorgis Orthodox church, The Emperor Asrat, The Mysterious religion, and The Palace.

According to Bradt travel guides, Debre Markos is the most accommodating town on the journey between Addis Ababa and Bahir Dar, the town's has several hotels and restaurants offering high standards experience for comperatively low prices.

Transportation 
Construction on Africa's first electric bus manufacturing factory began on 43 hectares of land in Debre Markos in January, 2007 by Rus Afro Trolleybus, a joint Russian-Ethiopian partnership. CEO and major shareholder Getachew Eshetu predicted that the factory would have the capacity to manufacture 500 trolley buses per year, and employ 5,000 people.

The city had three highways and one airport, Debre Markos Airport but now it is not functional due to poor government attention.

Notes

References

 
Districts of Amhara Region
Ethiopia
Cities and towns in Ethiopia